Atil, also Itil, was the capital of the Khazar Khaganate from the mid-8th century to the late 10th century. 
Known to have been situated on the Silk Road, in the vicinity of the Caspian Sea, its precise location has long been unknown. In 2008, a site at Samosdelka, a village in the Volga Delta that is some 30 km south-west of Astrakhan has been identified as the site of Atil.

The name Atil is from the Turkic phrase meaning "great river", a name of the Volga River.

History

Atil was located along the Volga delta at the northwestern corner of the Caspian Sea. Following the defeat of the Khazars in the Second Arab-Khazar War, Atil became the capital of Khazaria. 

Ibn Khordadbeh, writing in ca. 870, names  Khamlij as the capital of the Khazars. This is presumably a rendition of Turkic khaganbaligh "city of the khan" and refers to the city later (in the 10th century) named as Atil in Arab historiography.

At its height, the city was a major center of trade, and consisted of three parts separated by the Volga. The western part contained the administrative center of the city, with a court house and a large military garrison. The eastern part of the city was built later and acted as the commercial center of the Atil, and had many public baths and shops. Between them was an island on which stood the palaces of the Khazar Khagan and Bek. The island was connected to one of the other parts of the city by a pontoon bridge. 
According to Arab sources of the 10th century, one half of the city was referred to as Atil, while the other was named Khazaran.

Atil was a multi-ethnic and religiously diverse city, inhabited by Jews, Christians, Muslims, Shamanists, and Pagans, many of them traders from foreign countries. All of the religious groups had their own places of worship in the city, and there were seven judges appointed to settle disputes (two Christian, two Jewish, and two Muslim judges, with a single judge for all of the Shamanists and other Pagans).

Svyatoslav I of Kiev sacked Atil in 968 or 969 CE. Ibn Hawqal and al-Muqaddasi refer to Atil after 969, indicating that it may have been rebuilt. Al-Biruni (mid-11th century) reported that Atil was again in ruins, and did not mention the later city of Saqsin which was built nearby, so it is possible that this new Atil was only destroyed in the middle of the 11th century.

Samosdelka site
The archaeological remains of Atil have never been positively identified. It has been hypothesized that they were washed away by the rising level of the Caspian Sea. However, beginning in 2003 Dmitri Vasilyev of Astrakhan State University led a series of excavations at the Samosdelskoye site near the village of Samosdelka (Russian: Самосделка) in the Volga Delta. Vasilyev connected artifacts from the site with Khazar, Oghuz and Bulgar culture, leading him to believe that he had discovered the site of Saqsin. The matter is still unresolved. In 2006 Vasilyev announced his belief that the lowest stratum at the Samosdelka site was identical with the site of Atil. In 2008, this team of Russian archaeologists announced that they had discovered the ruins of Atil.

Gallery

References

Further reading
 Barthold, W. (1996). "Khazar". Encyclopaedia of Islam (Brill Online). Eds.: P. Bearman, Th. Bianquis, C.E. Bosworth, E. van Donzel and W.P. Heinrichs. Brill.
Kevin Alan Brook. The Jews of Khazaria. 2nd ed. Rowman & Littlefield Publishers, Inc, 2006.
 Douglas Morton Dunlop (1997). "Itil". Encyclopaedia Judaica (CD-ROM Edition Version 1.0). Ed. Cecil Roth. Keter Publishing House. 
Douglas M. Dunlop. The History of the Jewish Khazars, Princeton, N.J.: Princeton University Press, 1954.
Peter B. Golden. Khazar Studies: An Historio-Philological Inquiry into the Origins of the Khazars. Budapest: Akademia Kiado, 1980.
Norman Golb and Omeljan Pritsak, Khazarian Hebrew Documents of the Tenth Century. Ithaca: Cornell Univ. Press, 1982.
Thomas S. Noonan. "The Khazar Economy." Archivum Eurasiae Medii Aevi 9 (1995–1997): 253–318.
Thomas S. Noonan. "Les Khazars et le commerce oriental." Les Échanges au Moyen Age: Justinien, Mahomet, Charlemagne: trois empires dans l'économie médiévale, pp. 82–85. Dijon: Editions Faton S.A., 2000.
Thomas S. Noonan. "The Khazar Qaghanate and its Impact on the Early Rus' State: The translatio imperii from Itil to Kiev." Nomads in the Sedentary World, eds. Anatoly Mikhailovich Khazanov and André Wink, pp. 76–102. Richmond, England: Curzon Press, 2001.
Omeljan Pritsak. "The Khazar Kingdom's Conversion to Judaism." (Journal Article in Harvard Ukrainian Studies, 1978)
D. Vasilyev (Д. Васильев), "The Itil Dream (at the excavation site of the ancient capital of the Khazar Khaganate)" (Итиль-мечта (на раскопках древнего центра Хазарского каганата))

Sources

External links
 Russian archaeologists find long-lost Jewish capital 
 Atil entry from Dead Cities (in Russian)

Geography of Astrakhan Oblast
Defunct towns in Russia
Khazar towns
Populated places on the Volga
Submerged places
Underwater ruins
Former populated places in Russia
Saltovo-Mayaki culture